The Jiuyi Mountains ( Jiuyi Shan) are a mountain range in Hunan province, China. They are located in the Yongzhou, Ningyuan and Lanshan region, bordering Guangdong province.
They are part of the Mengzhu Mountains of the Nanling Range.

These mountains are reputed to be the burial place of Emperor Shun in ancient Chinese tradition.

It is traditionally inhabited by the Yao people. Autonomous counties include: Daqiao Yao Ethnic Township

References

Ranges of the Nanling Mountains
Mountain ranges of Hunan